Thomas Stoddart Porteous (October 1865 – 23 February 1919) was an English footballer who played as a right back, for Sunderland and also one appearance for England.

Career

Club
Although born in Newcastle upon Tyne, Porteous grew up in Dalkeith and Kilmarnock in Scotland, and started his football career north of the border with Hearts before joining Kilmarnock in 1884.

In 1889 Porteous arrived at Sunderland after gaining a high reputation in Scotland, and joining what was to become known as the Team of All the Talents, filled almost entirely with players recruited from Scotland. He made his debut on 18 January 1890 in a FA Cup match against Blackburn Rovers, but had to wait until 13 September before making his League debut. He soon became a fixture in the side, appearing in all 22 league matches in 1890–91. This was Sunderland's first season in the Football League at the end of which they finished in seventh place.

The following season Sunderland dominated the league, taking the title by a margin of five points, with Porteous missing only one match. Porteous was again an ever-present figure in the 1892–93 season when Sunderland took the Football League title for the second consecutive season, this time by a substantial 11-point margin.

Although he started the 1893–94 season, after two matches he lost his place to Peter Meehan, a Scottish international who had recently been signed from Celtic. Porteous left Sunderland at the end of the season, moving to Rotherham Town where he spent two seasons, also spending a few months with Manchester City.

International
Porteous' England call-up came in the 1890–91 season against Wales, when England won 4–1 at Newcastle Road, Sunderland in the 1891 British Home Championship. The Wales game was his only game for England, which was also the first international fixture played in Sunderland.

Honours
Sunderland
Football League champions: 1891–92, 1892–93

References

External links

Full details of Sunderland career
Sunderland profile

1865 births
Footballers from Newcastle upon Tyne
1919 deaths
English footballers
England international footballers
English Football League players
Heart of Midlothian F.C. players
Kilmarnock F.C. players
Sunderland A.F.C. players
Rotherham Town F.C. (1878) players
Manchester City F.C. players
Association football defenders
Anglo-Scots
English people of Scottish descent
Footballers from Kilmarnock